Jonas Filip Ludvigsson is a Swedish physician and epidemiologist. He is a Professor in the Department of Medical Epidemiology and Biostatistics at the Karolinska Institutet, Sweden, and a senior pediatrician in the Department of Pediatrics at Örebro University Hospital, Sweden. Ludvigsson is  known for being one of the 47 initial signees of the Great Barrington Declaration.

Biography 
Jonas Ludvigsson was born in Sweden. He studied medicine at Linköping University, in Sweden, where he received his M.D. in 1995, and where he defended his PhD thesis in 2001 (Medicine).

Ludvigsson became a Professor at the Karolinska Institutet, in 2013. Since that time, he has conducted extensive epidemiological research in the field of gastroenterology, including in celiac disease, inflammatory bowel diseases, pregnancy outcomes, and complications of chronic liver disease. He serves as a member of the steering group of the Swedish Inflammatory Bowel Disease (IBD) Register. Between 2011 and 2014, Ludvigsson was chairman of the Swedish Epidemiological Association. In 2014, he was elected to serve as chair of the Swedish Society of Pediatrics (2014-2016). and has performed extensive research also in pediatrics.

Between 2015 and 2017, Ludvigsson led a nationwide effort to collect all of the gastrointestinal histopathology reports from all 28 pathology labs in Sweden (1967-2017), from which he constructed the first nationwide gastrointestinal pathology register, that forms the foundation of the ESPRESSO study (Epidemiology Strengthened by histoPathology Reports in Sweden).

Ludvigsson has received numerous awards for his epidemiological research and leadership. He was named the 2010 "Rising Star in Gastroenterology" by the European Gastroenterology Association, and he also received the award for the 2013 Alumnus of the year, from Linköping University. He is an Honorary Professor at the Columbia University School of Medicine in New York, NY, and also at the Nottingham University School of Medicine, in the UK. Ludvigsson also serves as an active member of the Editorial Boards of both the European Journal of Epidemiology and Alimentary, Pharmacology & Therapeutics. Beginning in 2019, he was named the staff pediatrician at the Swedish Television station, TV4.

References

External links 
 

Swedish epidemiologists
Academic staff of the Karolinska Institute
Living people
Year of birth missing (living people)
21st-century Swedish physicians